Clubview Heights is a neighborhood located in the Midtown section of Columbus, Georgia.

References 

Columbus metropolitan area, Georgia
Neighborhoods in Columbus, Georgia